Hamide is the feminine given name version of the name Hamid. It may refer to:

Hamide
Hamide Akbayir (born 1959), German politician of Turkish descent
Hamide Ayşe Sultan (1887–1960), Ottoman princess, daughter of Sultan Abdul Hamid II
Hamide Bıkçın Tosun (born 1978), Turkish Taekwondo practitioner
Hamide Kurt (born 1993),  Turkish Paralympian athlete

Hamideh
Hamideh Abbasali (born 1990), Iranian karateka
Hamideh Kheirabadi (1924–2010), Iranian film and theater actress